is a 2011 Japanese film directed by Noboru Iguchi. The film is a remake of the 1970s show Denjin Zaborger.

Plot

An evil criminal organisation called Sigma kidnap prominent business leaders to harvest their DNA and only Karate-Robo Zaborgar can save them.

Cast
Itsuji Itao as Yutaka Daimon
Akira Emoto as Dr. Akunomiya
Yasuhisa Furuhara as The Younger Daimon
Naoto Takenaka as	Daimon's father		
Hiroyuki Watanabe as Detective

References

External links
 

2011 films
2010s Japanese-language films
Japanese action films
Fictional karateka
Films directed by Noboru Iguchi
Films based on television series
Nikkatsu films
Tokusatsu films
Films scored by Shunsuke Kikuchi
2010s Japanese films